Ancylis laetana is a moth of the family Tortricidae. It is found in most of Europe, except the Iberian Peninsula, the Balkan Peninsula, Iceland, Ireland and Ukraine.

The wingspan is 14–18 mm. Adults are on wing from May to June in one generation per year.

The larvae feed on Populus tremula and occasionally Populus nigra. They feed in a single leaf which is spun pod-like. The larvae can be found under the folded leaf margin or among the spun leaves.

References

External links
Lepiforum.de

Moths described in 1775
Enarmoniini
Moths of Europe
Taxa named by Johan Christian Fabricius